Nava Kailasam refers to nine individual ancient temples of Lord Shiva in southern districts of Tamil Nadu. These temples are located in the districts Tirunelveli and Tuticorin.

Legend
All these nine temples are linked with Sage agasthiyar.

Temples 
Sage agasthiyar was doing penance in the podhikai hills. One of his prime disciples was urOmacha munivar. He prayed Lord pashupathi to get liberation. The Lord wanted to bless this to him through his guru agasthiyar. agasthiyar put nine flowers in the river and asked uromacha munivar to install a shiva lingam as kailasha nathar, wherever the flowers dock on the bank and finally bathe and worship the Lord in the place where the river joins the ocean, by doing so he would get what he wished. Adhering to his guru's words, munivar worshipped the Stain-throated Lord in the nine places where the nine flowers stopped in the form of shiva lingam and finally bathed in the place where thamiraparani joined the ocean and got liberated. These nine abodes are called nava kayilayam.

These nine Siva temples are located uniquely on the river bed of Thamirabarani river. They are:

See also
 Nava Tirupathi

References

External links 
 

Hindu temples in Tamil Nadu
Shiva temples in Tamil Nadu
Lists of Hindu temples in India